Safir Hayat (born 15 September 1981) is a Pakistani-born Norwegian cricketer. He played in the 2015 ICC World Cricket League Division Six tournament.

References

External links
 

1981 births
Living people
Norwegian cricketers
Pakistani emigrants to Norway
People from Kharian